The 67th Regiment Illinois Volunteer Infantry was an infantry regiment that served in the Union Army during the American Civil War.

Service
The 67th  Illinois Infantry was organized at Camp Douglas at Chicago, Illinois and mustered into Federal service on June 13, 1862, for a term of three months.  It served as camp guard at Camp Douglas during its entire time in service.

The regiment was mustered out on October 6, 1862.

Total strength and casualties
The regiment suffered 12 enlisted men casualties, who died of disease, for a total of 12 fatalities.

Commanders
Colonel Rosell M. Hough - mustered out with the regiment.

See also
List of Illinois Civil War Units
Illinois in the American Civil War

Notes

References
The Civil War Archive

Units and formations of the Union Army from Illinois
1862 establishments in Illinois
Military units and formations established in 1862
Military units and formations disestablished in 1862